Winfield is a census-designated place located in Union Township, Union County in the state of Pennsylvania.  The community is located in eastern Union County at the intersection of Pennsylvania Route 304 and U.S. Route 15, which is located along the shores of the West Branch Susquehanna River.  As of the 2010 census the population was 900 residents.

Notable person
 Steve Kline (born 1972), Major League Baseball relief pitcher for five teams over an eleven-year career.

See also
Winfield Creek

References

Census-designated places in Union County, Pennsylvania
Census-designated places in Pennsylvania